This article describes the phonology of the Oromo language.

Consonants
The Oromo language has 24 to 28  consonant phonemes depending on the dialect.

 is a voiced retroflex plosive. It may have an implosive quality for some speakers.

The velar fricative  is mainly used in the eastern dialect (Harar) as a phoneme.

Vowels
Oromo has five vowels which all contrast long and short vowels. Sometimes there is a change in vowel quality when the vowel is short. Short vowels tend to be more centralized than their counterparts.

Though sometimes diphthongs may occur, there are none that occur in a word's unaltered form.

Tone
When needed, the conventions for marking tone in written Oromo are as follows:
 acute accent - high tone
 grave accent - low tone
 circumflex - falling tone

Tones on long vowels are marked on the first vowel symbol.

In Oromo, the tone-bearing unit is the mora rather than the vowel of the syllable. A long vowel or a diphthong consists of two morae and can bear two tones. Each mora is defined as being of high or low tone. Only one high tone occurs per word and this must be on the final or penultimate mora. Particles do not have a high tone. (These include prepositions, clitic pronouns for subject and object, impersonal subject pronouns and focus markers.) There are therefore three possible "accentual patterns" in word roots.

Phonetically there are three tones: high, low and falling. Rules:
 On a long vowel, a sequence of high-low is realized as a falling tone.
 On a long vowel, a sequence of low-high is realized as high-high. (Occasionally it is a rising tone.)

This use of tone may be characterized as pitch accent. It is similar to that in Somali.

Stress is connected with tone. The high tone has strong stress; the falling tone has less stress and the low tone has no stress.

Phonological processes

Allophones
  becomes  between two vowels.
  becomes  between two vowels.

Epenthesis
When a vowel occurs in word-initial position, a glottal stop is inserted before it.

Elision
  is dropped before .
  are dropped before .

Sandhi
Phonological changes occur at morpheme boundaries (sandhi) for specific grammatical morphemes. There may be assimilation.

 The cluster  becomes a geminated .
  becomes 
  becomes  between vowels

References

Works cited
 
 

Oromo language
Afroasiatic phonologies